Palmerston Forts built around the River Clyde include:

Ardhallow Battery, Dunoon
Fort Matilda, Greenock
Portkil Battery, Clyde

Forts in Scotland
South coast